Edgewood House is an historic school building located at Pelham Manor, Westchester County, New York.  It was built in 1893 and is a -story, wood and masonry building in the Colonial Revival style. It is composed of a wide central gable roofed pavilion, flanked by flat-roofed wings of balanced proportions.  It features deep porches and a large semi-elliptical bay window.  It was once associated with Mrs. Hazen's School (1889-1915) and is representative of a turn-of-the-century academic building.  The building once housed reception areas, classrooms, a gymnasium, dormitories, and staff quarters.  It has been converted to apartments.

It was added to the National Register of Historic Places in 1986.

See also
National Register of Historic Places listings in southern Westchester County, New York

References

School buildings on the National Register of Historic Places in New York (state)
Colonial Revival architecture in New York (state)
Houses completed in 1893
Pelham, New York
Buildings and structures in Westchester County, New York
National Register of Historic Places in Westchester County, New York